Vinicka may refer to:
 Vinicka, Berane Municipality, Montenegro 
 Vinicka (Prijepolje), Serbia